The following highways are numbered 2000:

Jamaica
 Highway 2000

United States
  Hawaii Route 2000
  Virginia State Route 2000

See also
 Highway 2000 (board game)